Duroziez's disease is a congenital variant of mitral stenosis. It was described in 1877 by Paul Louis Duroziez.

References

Heart diseases